Renato Cárdenas Álvarez (Calen, Dalcahue, 2 August 1949 - Ancud, 14 April 2022) was a Chilean historian, writer, poet and teacher. He was part of the cultural movement Aumen, of which he was one of the founders together with Carlos Trujillo in 1975.

Cárdenas studied pedagogy in the University of Chile and the Escuela de Bellas Artes in Valparaíso. Later he obtained a scholarship to study communication at London University. He was member of the Academia Chilena de la Lengua and academic director of the Archivo Bibliográfico y Documental de Chiloé.

References

1949 births
2022 deaths
People from Chiloé Province
20th-century Chilean historians
20th-century Chilean male writers
21st-century Chilean historians
University of Chile alumni
20th-century Chilean poets
21st-century Chilean poets
21st-century Chilean male writers
Chilean male poets
Chilean educators